The Roman Catholic Diocese of Le Puy-en-Velay (Latin: Dioecesis Aniciensis; French: Diocèse du Puy-en-Velay ) is a diocese of the Latin Church of the Roman Catholic Church in France. The diocese comprises the whole Department of Haute-Loire, in the Region of Auvergne-Rhône-Alpes. Currently the diocese is a suffragan of the Archdiocese of Clermont. Last bishop, as of April 2015 was bishop Luc Crépy. Actually is bishop in Versailles,  Since February 2021. The current bishop,  as of March 2022 is Yves Baumgarten. 

The territory of the old Diocese of Le Puy, suppressed by the Concordat of 1801, was united with the Diocese of Saint-Flour and became a diocese again in 1823. The district of Brioude, which had belonged to the Diocese of Saint-Flour under the old regime, was thenceforward included in the new Diocese of Le Puy. Le Puy is on the Way of St. James, the historical pilgrimage to Compostela.

Early history

The Martyrology of Ado and the first legend of St. Front of Périgueux (written perhaps in the middle of the tenth century, by Gauzbert, chorepiscopus of Limoges) speak of a certain priest named George who was brought to life by the touch of St. Peter's staff, and who accompanied St. Front, St. Peter's missionary and first Bishop of Périgueux. A legend of St. George, the origin of which, according to Duchesne is not earlier than the eleventh century, makes that saint one of the seventy-two disciples, and tells how he founded the Church of Civitas Vetula in the County of Le Velay, and how, at the request of St. Martial, he caused an altar to the Blessed Virgin to be erected on Mont Anis (Mons Anicius).

After St. George, certain local traditions of very late origin point to Sts. Macarius, Marcellinus, Roricius, Eusebius, Paulianus, and Vosy (Evodius) as bishops of Le Puy. It must have been from St. Paulianus that the town of Ruessium, now Saint-Paulien, received its name; and it was probably St. Vosy who completed the church of Our Lady of Le Puy at Anicium and transferred the episcopal see from Ruessium to Anicium. St. Vosy was apprised in a vision that the angels themselves had dedicated the cathedral to the Blessed Virgin, whence the epithet Angelic given to the cathedral of Le Puy. It is impossible to say whether this St. Evodius is the same who signed the decrees of the Council of Valence in 374. Neither can it be affirmed that St. Benignus, who in the seventh century founded a hospital at the gates of the basilica, and St. Agrevius, the seventh-century martyr from whom the town of Saint-Agrève Chiniacum took its name, were really bishops.

Duchesne thinks that the chronology of these early bishops rests on very little evidence and that very ill-supported by documents; before the tenth century only six individuals appear of whom it can be said with certainty that they were bishops of Le Puy. The first of these, Scutarius, the legendary architect of the first cathedral, dates, if we may trust the inscription which bears his name, from the end of the fourth century.

Pilgrimage and medieval status

Legend traces the origin of the pilgrimage of Le Puy to an apparition of the Blessed Virgin to a sick widow whom St. Martial had converted. No French pilgrimage was more frequented in the Middle Ages. Charlemagne came twice, in 772 and 800; there is a legend that in 772 he established a foundation at the cathedral for ten poor canons (chanoines de paupérie), and he chose Le Puy, with Aachen and Saint-Gilles, as a centre for the collection of Peter's Pence.

Charles the Bald visited Le Puy in 877, Eudes of France in 892, Robert I of France in 1029, Philip Augustus in 1183. Louis IX met the King of Aragon there in 1245; and in 1254 passing through Le Puy on his return from Palestine, he gave to the cathedral an ebony image of the Blessed Virgin clothed in gold brocade. After him, Le Puy was visited by Philip the Bold in 1282, by Philip the Fair in 1285, by Charles VI of France in 1394, by Charles VII of France in 1420, and by the mother of Joan of Arc in 1429. Louis XI made the pilgrimage in 1436 and 1475, and in 1476 halted three leagues from the city and went to the cathedral barefooted. Charles VIII visited it in 1495, Francis I of France in 1533.

Theodulph, Bishop of Orléans, brought to Our Lady of Le Puy, as an ex-voto for his deliverance, a magnificent Bible, the letters of which were made of plates of gold and silver, which he had himself put together, about 820, while in prison at Angers. St. Mayeul, St. Odilon, St. Robert, St. Hugh of Grenoble, St. Anthony of Padua, St. Dominic, St. Vincent Ferrer, St. John Francis Regis were pilgrims to Le Puy.

The Church of Le Puy received, on account of its dignity and fame, temporal and spiritual favours. Concessions made in 919 by William the Young, Count of Auvergne and Le Velay, and in 923 by King Raoul, gave it sovereignty over the whole population of the town (bourg) of Anis, a population which soon amounted to 30,000 souls. In 999, Pope Sylvester II consecrated his friend Théodard, a monk of Aurillac, Bishop of Le Puy, to replace Stephen of Gévaudan, whom his uncle Guy, Bishop of Le Puy, had in his lifetime, designated to be his successor, and whom a Roman council had excommunicated. Sylvester II exempted Théodard from all metropolitan jurisdiction, a privilege which Pope Leo IX confirmed to the Bishops of Le Puy, also granting them the right, until then reserved to archbishops exclusively of wearing the pallium. "Nowhere", he said in his Bull, "does the Blessed Virgin receive a more special and more filial worship."

It was from Le Puy that Pope Urban II dated (15 August 1095) the Letters Apostolic convoking the Council of Clermont, and it was a canon of Le Puy, Raymond d'Aiguilles, chaplain to the Count of Toulouse, who wrote the history of the crusade. Pope Gelasius II, Pope Callistus II, Pope Innocent II and Pope Alexander III visited Le Puy to pray, and with the visit of one of these popes must be connected the origin of the great Jubilee which is granted to Our Lady of Le Puy whenever Good Friday falls on 25 March, the Feast of the Annunciation. It is supposed that this jubilee was instituted by Callistus II, who passed through Le Puy, in April, 1119, or by Alexander III, who was there in August, 1162, and June, 1165, or by Pope Clement IV, who had been Bishop of Le Puy. The first jubilee historically known took place in 1407, and in 1418 the chronicles mention a Bull of Pope Martin V prolonging the duration of the jubilee. During the Middle Ages, everyone who had made the pilgrimage to Le Puy had the privilege of making a will in extremis with only two witnesses instead of seven.

Honoured with such prerogatives, the Church of Le Puy assumed a sort of primacy in respect to most of the Churches of France, and even of Christendom. This primacy manifested itself practically in a right to beg, established with the authorization of the Holy See, in virtue of which the chapter of Le Puy levied a veritable tax upon almost all the Christian countries to support its hospital of Notre-Dame.

Relationship with Girona

In Catalonia this droit de quête, recognized by the Spanish Crown, was so thoroughly established that the chapter had its collectors permanently installed in that country. A famous "fraternity" existed between the chapter of Le Puy and that of Girona in Catalonia.

Later history

The statue of Our Lady of Le Puy and the other treasures escaped the pillage of the Middle Ages. The roving banditti were victoriously dispersed, in 1180, by the Confraternity of the Chaperons (Hooded Cloaks) founded at the suggestion of a canon of Le Puy. In 1562 and 1563 Le Puy was successfully defended against the Huguenots by priests and religious armed with cuirasses and arquebuses. But in 1793 the statue was torn from its shrine and burned in the public square. Père de Ravignan, in 1846, and the Abbé Combalot, in 1850, were inspired with the idea of a great monument to the Blessed Virgin on the Rocher Corneille. Napoleon III placed at the disposal of Bishop Morlhon 213 pieces of artillery taken by Pélissier at Sebastopol, and the colossal statue of "Notre-Dame de France" cast from the iron of these guns, amounting in weight to 150,000 kilogrammes, or more than 330,000 lbs. avoirdupois, was dedicated 12 September 1860.

Saints

The saints specially venerated in the diocese are:

St. Domninus, martyr, whose body is preserved in the cathedral;
St. Julian of Brioude, martyr in 304, and his companion, St. Ferréol;
St. Calminius (Carmery), Duke of Auvergne, who prompted the foundation of the Abbey of Le Monastier, and St. Eudes, first abbot (end of the sixth century);
St. Theofredus (Chaffre, Theofrid), Abbot of Le Monastier and martyr under the Saracens (c. 735);
St. Mayeul, Abbot of Cluny, who, in the second half of the tenth century, cured a blind man at the gates of Le Puy, and whose name was given, in the fourteenth century, to the university in which the clergy made their studies;
St. Odilon, Abbot of Cluny (962–1049), who embraced the life of a regular canon in the monastery of St. Julien de Brioude;
St. Robert d'Aurillac (d. 1067) who founded the monastery of Chaise Dieu in the Brioude district;
St. Peter Chavanon (d. 1080), a canon regular, founder and first provost of the Abbey of Pébrac.

At the age of eighteen M. Olier, afterwards the founder of Saint-Sulpice, was Abbot in commendam of Pébrac and, in 1626 was an "honorary count-canon of the chapter of St. Julien de Brioude".

We may mention as natives of this diocese: the Benedictine, Hughes Lanthenas (1634–1701), who edited the works of St. Bernard and St. Anselm, and was the historian of the Abbey of Vendôme; the Benedictine, Jacques Boyer, joint author of Gallia Christiana; Cardinal de Polignac (d. 1741), author of the "Antilucretius".

Cathedral

The cathedral of Le Puy, which forms the highest point of the city, rising from the foot of the Rocher Corneille, exhibits architecture of every period from the fifth century to the fifteenth. The architectural effect is audacious and picturesque.

The four galleries of the cloister were constructed during a period extending from the Carolingian epoch to the twelfth century. The Benedictine monastery of the Chaise Dieu united in 1640 to the Congregation of St-Maur, still stands, with the fortifications which Abbot de Chanac caused to be built between 1378 and 1420, and the church, rebuilt in the fourteenth century by Clement VI, who had made his studies here, and by Gregory XI, his nephew. This church contains the tomb of Clement VI. The fine church of S. Julien de Brioude, in florid Byzantine style, dates from the eleventh or twelfth century. Besides the great pilgrimage of Le Puy, we may mention those of Notre-Dame de Pradelles, at Pradelles, a pilgrimage dating from 1512; of Notre-Dame d'Auteyrac, at Sorlhac, which was very popular before the Revolution; of Notre-Dame Trouvée, at Lavoute-Chilhac.

Bishops

To 1000

St Voisy 374
St Suacre 396
St Sautaire
St Armentaire 451
St Benigne
St Faustin ca. 468
St Georg ca. 480
St Marcellin 6. Jh.
Forbius ca. 550
Aurele ca. 585
St Agreve 602
Eusebius ca. 615
Basilius ca. 635
Kutilius ca. 650
St Eudes ca. 670
Duicidius ca. 700
Hilgericus ca. 720?
Tornoso ca. 760?
Macaire ca. 780
Borice 811
Dructan ca. 850
Hardouin 860, 866
Guido I. 875
Norbert de Poitiers 876–903
Adalard 919–924
Hector 925?–934?
Godescalc 935–955
Bégon 961
Peter I. 970?
Guido II of Anjou 975–993
Stephan de Gévaudan 995–998
Theotard 999

1000-1300

Guido III 1004
Frédol D'Anduze 1016
Stephan de Mercœur 1031–1052
Peter II de Mercœur 1053–1073
Stephan d'Auvergne 1073
Stephan de Polignac 1073–1077
Adhemar de Monteil 1082–1098
Pons de Tournon 1102–1112
Pons Maurice de Monfboissier 1112–1128
Humbert D'Albon 1128–1144
Peter III 1145–1156
Pons III 1158
Pierre de Solignac 1159–1191
Aimard 1192–1195
Odilon de Mercœur 1197–1202
:fr:Bertrand de Chalençon 1202–1213
Robert de Mehun 1213–1219
Étienne de Chalencon 1220–1231
Bernard de Rochefort 1231–1236
Bernard de Montaigu 1236–1248
Guillaume de Murat 1248–1250
Bernard de Ventadour 1251–1255
Armand de Polignac 1255–1257
Guy Foulques 1257–1260, later Pope Clement IV
Guillaume de La Roue 1260–1282
Guido V. 1283
Frédol de Saint-Bonnet 1284–1289
Guy de Neuville 1290–1296
Jean de Comines 1296–1308

1300-1500

Bernard de Castanet 1308–1317
Guillaume de Brosse 1317–1318
Durand de Saint Pourçain 1318–1326
Pierre Gorgeul 1326–1327
Bernard Brun 1327–1342
Jean Chandorat 1342–1356
Jean du Jaurens 1356–1361
Bertrand de la Tour 1361–1382
Bertrand de Chanac 1382–1385
Pierre Girard 1385–1390
Gilles de Bellemère 1390–1392
Itier de Martreuil 1392–1394
Pierre d'Ailly 1395–1397
Elie de Lestrange 1397–1418
Guillaume de Chalencon 1418–1443
Jean de Bourbon 1443–1485
Geoffroy de Pompadour 1486–1514

1500-1801

Antoine de Chabannes 1514–1535
(Agostino Trivulzio 1525, administrator)
François de Sarcus 1536–1557
Martin de Beaune 1557–1561
Antoine de Sénecterre 1561–1593
Jacques de Serres 1596–1621
Just de Serres 1621–1641
Henri Cauchon de Maupas du Tour 1641–1661
Armand de Béthune 1661–1703
Claude de La Roche-Aymon 1703–1720
Godefroy Maurice de Conflans 1721–1725
Fr.-Charles de Beringhen D'Armainvilliers 1725–1742
Jean-Georges Le Franc de Pompignan 1742–1774, † 1790
Joseph-Marie de Galard de Terraube 1774–1790 (1801)

From 1823

Louis-Jacques Maurice de Bonald 1823–1839 (later Archbishop of Lyon)
Pierre-Marie-Joseph Darcimoles 1840–1846 (later Archbishop of Aix)
Joseph-Auguste-Victorin de Morlhon 1846–1862
Pierre-Marc Le Breton 1863–1886
André-Clément-Jean-Baptiste-Joseph-Marie Fulbert Petit 1887–1894 (later Archbishop of Besançon)
Constant-Ludovic-Marie Guillois 1894–1907
Thomas François Boutry 1907–1925
Norbert Georges Pierre Rousseau 1925–1939
Joseph-Marie Martin 1940–1948
Joseph-Marie-Jean-Baptiste Chappe 1949–1960
Jean-Pierre-Georges Dozolme 1960–1978
Louis-Pierre-Joseph Cornet 1978–1987
Henri Marie Raoul Brincard, C.R.S.A 1988–2014
Lucien Crepy 2015–2021
Yves Baumgarten 2022–present)

See also
 Catholic Church in France

References

Sources
 pp. 548–549. (Use with caution; obsolete)
  p. 301. (in Latin)
 p. 175.

 p. 219.

External links
  Centre national des Archives de l'Église de France, L’Épiscopat francais depuis 1919, retrieved: 2016-12-24.

Acknowledgment
 

Le Puy-en-Velay
Haute-Loire
1801 disestablishments in France
Le Puy-en-Velay
Le Puy-en-Velay
1823 establishments in France